The Los Encinos Open was a golf tournament on the Tour de las Américas that was held at Los Encinos Golf Club in Toluca, Mexico. In 2003 it was co-sanctioned with the Challenge Tour.

Winners

Notes

References

External links
Coverage on the Challenge Tour's official site

Former Challenge Tour events
Former Tour de las Américas events
Golf tournaments in Mexico